Firmin N'Guia (born 1 February 1940) is an Ivorian boxer. He competed in the men's light heavyweight event at the 1964 Summer Olympics. At the 1964 Summer Olympics, he defeated Frederick Casey of Australia, before losing to František Poláček of Czechoslovakia.

References

1940 births
Living people
Ivorian male boxers
Olympic boxers of Ivory Coast
Boxers at the 1964 Summer Olympics
Place of birth missing (living people)
Light-heavyweight boxers